Charles Klein (January 7, 1867 – May 7, 1915) was an English-born playwright and actor who emigrated to America in 1883.  Among his works was the libretto of John Philip Sousa's operetta, El Capitan.  Klein's talented siblings included the composer Manuel and the critic Herman Klein.  He drowned during the sinking of the RMS Lusitania.

Biography
Klein was born in London, England to Hermann Klein and his wife Adelaide (née Soman). Apparently, the elder Klein emigrated from Riga, Latvia.  Once in Norwich, Hermann became a professor of foreign languages at the King Edward VI Grammar School, and Adelaide taught dance. The younger Klein's five brothers included Max, a violinist; Manuel, a composer; Herman, a music critic and music teacher; Alfred, an actor; and Philip.  They had a sister, Adelaide.  He was educated at North London College.

Klein moved to New York City in 1883 and began his theatrical career by appearing in Little Lord Fauntleroy and other juvenile roles such as The Messenger from Jarvis Section and The Romany Rye.  He married Lillian Gottlieb in Manhattan on July 10, 1888.  They had two sons, Philip Klein, a screenwriter and producer (April 24, 1888 - June 8, 1935), and John V. Klein (born July 2, 1908).

Klein first wrote for the theater in 1890, when he was commissioned to revise The Schatchen, in which he was then appearing. This was followed by a collaboration with Charles Coote on A Mile a Minute (1890). He came into prominence as a dramatist in 1897 with the Charles Frohman production of Heartsease on which he was co-author with Joseph I. C. Clark, and which featured Henry Miller.

For a time he was play censor for producer Charles Frohman.  Like many dramatists from the late 19th century and early 20th Century, Klein's plays are dated and few are still revived today.  He wrote the libretto of John Philip Sousa's best remembered operetta, El Capitan, which continues to be revived occasionally.

Klein's melodramas were among the most successful of the first decade of the twentieth century, primarily because of their focus on themes of contemporary life in the United States.  In The Auctioneer (1901) and The Music Master (1904), actor David Warfield had great successes.  Klein's best-regarded drama, The Lion and the Mouse (1905), was prompted by a visit to the U.S. Senate.  The story concerns a young woman taking on a powerful business tycoon.  One of the corporate figures in the play was made to look like one of John D. Rockefeller's partner H. H. Rogers. His 1909 play, The Third Degree was adapted for film more than once.

Klein died during the sinking of the Lusitania in 1915, at the age of 48.

Selected plays
A Mile a Minute (1890)
By Proxy (1892)
The District Attorney (1895)
El Capitan (1896)
Two Little Vagrants (1896)
Heartsease (1897)
The Charlatan (1898)
A Royal Rogue (1900)
The Auctioneer (1901)
The Hon. John Grigsby (1902)
Mrs. Pickwick (1903)
The Music Master (1904)
The Lion and the Mouse (1905)
The Daughters of Men (1906)
The Step-Sister (1907)
The Third Degree (1908)  (In London this was titled "Find the Woman")
The Next of Kin (1909)
The Gamblers (1910)
Maggie Pepper (1911)
The Outsiders (1911)
The Ne'er Do Well (1912)
Potash and Perlmutter (1913)
The Money Makers (1914)

Notes

References

External links

 Charles Klein Papers at the Harry Ransom Center
 
 

1867 births
1915 deaths
American dramatists and playwrights
American people of Latvian-Jewish descent
Deaths on the RMS Lusitania
British people of Latvian-Jewish descent
English emigrants to the United States
Jewish American dramatists and playwrights
Writers from New York City
Writers from London